France vs British & Irish Lions, 1989. As part of the celebrations for the Bicentennial of the French Revolution, in 1989  played a British Lions team.

The match was classed as a friendly or exhibition game and thus test caps were not awarded.

Match

Teams
: Serge Blanco, Bernard Lacombe, Philippe Sella, Marc Andrieu, Patrice Lagisquet, Didier Camberabero, Pierre Berbizier (c), Marc Pujolle, Dominique Bouet, Laurent Seigne, Gilles Bourguignon, Thierry Devergie, Philippe Benetton, Olivier Roumat, Laurent Rodriguez. Res: Herve Chabowski, Marc Cécillon, Thierry Maset, Henri Sanz, Thierry Lacroix, David Berty 

British Lions: Paul Ackford, Mike Griffiths, Andy Robinson, Steve Smith, David Egerton, Jeff Probyn, Phillip Matthews, Damian Cronin, Rob Andrew (C), Jeremy Guscott, Gavin Hastings, Scott Hastings, Robert Jones, Brendan Mullin, Rory Underwood, Res: Fergus Aherne, 
Gary Callander, Craig Chalmers, Tony Clement, Des Fitzgerald, Neil Francis

References

British & Irish Lions matches
British Lions
1989–90 in British rugby union
1989 in Paris
October 1989 sports events in Europe
International sports competitions hosted by Paris
British Lions